Samantha Cristoforetti, OMRI (born in Milan on 26 April 1977) is an Italian European Space Agency astronaut, former Italian Air Force pilot and engineer. She holds the record for the longest uninterrupted spaceflight by a European astronaut (199 days, 16 hours), and she held the record for the longest single space flight by a woman until this was broken by Peggy Whitson in June 2017, and later by Christina Koch. She is also the first Italian woman in space. She took command of ISS Expedition 68 on 28 September 2022.

In December 2021, Politico Europe named her as one of the "dreamers" in its annual list of the 28 most influential people in Europe.

Early life

Cristoforetti was born in Milan in 1977. She spent her childhood in Malè, in Val di Sole, Trentino, Italy. When she was 18, she took an AFS exchange program to the US and attended Space Camp.

Career

She studied in Bolzano and Trento and graduated from the Technical University of Munich with a degree in Mechanical Engineering. She studied at the École nationale supérieure de l'aéronautique et de l'espace in Toulouse, France, and at the Mendeleev Russian University of Chemistry and Technology in Moscow. She graduated in Aeronautics Sciences (University 'Federico II', Naples) at the Accademia Aeronautica in Pozzuoli, becoming one of the first women to be a lieutenant and fighter pilot in the Italian Air Force. She is the second Space Camp alumnus in orbit.
As part of her training, she completed the Euro-NATO Joint Jet Pilot training. She has logged over 500 hours and has flown six types of military aircraft: SF-260, T-37, T-38, MB-339A, MB-339CD and AM-X.

In ESA

Cristoforetti was officially selected as an astronaut in 2009 by the European Space Agency, from a population of 8000 applicants.

Expedition 42/43

 
On 3 July 2012, the European Space Agency announced that Cristoforetti was set for a long-duration mission to the ISS in 2014.

On 23 November 2014, Soyuz TMA-15M, carrying Cristoforetti and two other astronauts launched from the Baikonur Cosmodrome in Kazakhstan. It successfully docked at the International Space Station roughly six hours later. Cristoforetti, along with her crew mates, returned safely from the ISS on 11 June 2015. She stayed 199 days in space and so became the holder of the record for the longest single mission for a woman. Previously, the NASA astronaut Sunita Williams held that record with 195 days after her Expedition 33 mission to the ISS. Cristoforetti's record was beaten on 5 June 2017 by Peggy Whitson during Expedition 52 and on 28 December 2019 by Christina Koch during Expedition 60.

Cristoforetti's first mission to the ISS was called Futura. During her stay, she performed numerous scientific experiments simulating prolonged stay in space and Lunar and Mars orbit. She was the primary operator during the undocking of the ATV-5. In February 2015, she began the outreach program "Mission X: Train Like an Astronaut", where students 8–12 years old were challenged to get fit during a nine-week program while Cristoforetti trained in space. Other outreach activities included learning how the Spirulina algae can be a source of food, while creating photosynthesis in a recycled air environment.

Cristoforetti was slated for 1, up to possibly 3, space walks, however when part of her personal EVA equipment was lost due to the failed launch 
of the Orbital Cygnus Orb-3 mission in October 2014, those EVAs were scrapped. 
That equipment for the ISS crew was on board of the failed Orb-3 mission is clear from the manifest of its cargo, which listed: "Total Cargo: 2,215 kg (With packaging: 2,296 kg) of which EVA Equipment: 66 kg."

Cristoforetti has been photographed with references to the Hitchhiker's Guide to the Galaxy on her shirt while her crewmate Anton Shkaplerov had a shirt with the Answer to the Ultimate Question of Life, the Universe, and Everything (being 42). ISS Expedition Mission 42 blog has a special section called "don't panic". 
In April 2015, the Dragon capsule delivered the ISSpresso, the first zero-G espresso machine which Cristoforetti installed. On 3 May 2015 she brewed the first cup of espresso in space and posted a picture of herself on Twitter, wearing a Starfleet uniform while drinking the espresso, with the comment "'There's coffee in that nebula'... ehm, I mean... in that #Dragon" (referencing Captain Janeway from Star Trek: Voyager, and her love of coffee).
 On 28 February 2015, the day following the death of Leonard Nimoy, who portrayed Mr. Spock on Star Trek, she photographed herself in the Cupola, wearing a Starfleet pin on her shirt and giving the Vulcan salute.
A one-month delay after the failure of two Russian rockets extended her stay in space past the European astronaut and female astronaut endurance records.

As an amateur radio woman, she participated in the ARISS initiative, Amateur Radio on the International Space Station, establishing numerous contacts with schools, both in 2015 and in 2022, answering students' questions.

On 16 July 2015, she was awarded the Order of Merit of the Italian Republic by Italian President Mattarella, who said: "She has been followed with affection and love by all Italians." The Order of Merit is the highest ranking honour of the Republic.

Expedition 67/68

Cristoforetti was assigned to fly to the International Space Station a second time in spring 2022. She is flying on the fourth mission of NASA's Commercial Crew Program, SpaceX Crew-4 on a SpaceX Crew Dragon spacecraft. The mission launched on April 27, 2022, before docking later that day. Cristoforetti's second mission to the ISS is called Minerva. She was the first person to make a TikTok video on board the International Space Station and some of her onboard videos has been viewed millions of times. On May 13, 2022, she became the first astronaut to operate the rHEALTH ONE, space's most powerful biomedical analyzer to date.  She demonstrated loading of tiny drops of biological samples into the device and collection of over 100 million raw data points over several minutes with laser-based sheath-flow analysis.  Her successful operation paves the way for big data in space for understanding and treating spaceflight medical conditions including circadian rhythm disturbances, bone loss, ionizing radiation exposure, kidney stones, among other conditions.

On 21 July 2022, Cristoforetti completed her first spacewalk, which lasted 7 hours and 5 minutes. Along with Oleg Artemyev, the joint ESA-Roscosmos spacewalk was the third spacewalk to set up the European Robotic Arm. Cristoforetti was the first non-Russian to use the Orlan spacesuit since Michael Barratt in June of 2009, and the first European astronaut to do so since Jean-Pierre Haigneré on April 16, 1999.

She took command of ISS Expedition 68 on September 28 2022.

NEEMO 23 

Cristoforetti commanded NEEMO mission 23 from 10 to 22 June 2019. This mission tested technologies and objectives for deep space mission and lunar explorations on the seafloor.

Personal life

Cristoforetti can speak Italian, English, German, French, Russian, and Chinese.

Cristoforetti is married to a French engineer, Lionel Ferra. In November 2016, she gave birth to a girl in Cologne, Germany. In 2021, she gave birth to a boy.

Cristoforetti appeared in the final of the Eurovision Song Contest 2022, which was held in Turin, in a pre-recorded message from the International Space Station.

Bibliography
Cristoforetti, Samantha (2020) Diary of an Apprentice Astronaut  Allen Lane, Great Britain (English translation from the Italian by Jill Foulston)

Honours and decorations

   Commander of the Order of Merit of the Italian Republic on 6 March 2013
   Knight Grand Cross of the Order of Merit of the Italian Republic on 16 July 2015

See also

Women in space
Italian Space Agency (Agenzia Spaziale Italiana, ASI)
A Beautiful Planet - 2016 IMAX documentary film showing scenes of Earth which features Cristoforetti and other ISS astronauts.

References

External links

 Spacefacts biography of Samantha Cristoforetti
 June 12 2015 Interview after Landing
 ESA Samantha Cristoforetti website

1977 births
Amateur radio women
Engineers from Milan
ESA astronauts
Italian Air Force personnel
Italian astronauts
Italian aviators
Knights Grand Cross of the Order of Merit of the Italian Republic
Living people
Military personnel from Milan
People from Trentino
Spacewalkers
SpaceX astronauts
Technical University of Munich alumni
University of Naples Federico II alumni
Women astronauts